Maffra is a town in Victoria, Australia,  east of Melbourne. It is in the Shire of Wellington local government area and it is the second most populous city of the Shire. It relies mainly on dairy farming and other agriculture, and is the site of one of Murray-Goulburn Cooperative's eight processing plants in Victoria. Maffra is a detour off the Princes Highway and is near Sale, Stratford, Newry, Tinamba, Heyfield and Rosedale. At the 2016 census, Maffra had a population of 4,316.

History
The town began as an outstation of the region's first cattle run, Boisdale, named by pioneer grazier Lachlan Macalister after a village on the island of South Uist in the Outer Hebrides, Scotland. The town appears to have taken its name from a group of squatters from Maffra, a village in the Monaro region of NSW, with its location between current Maffra and Newry being written on an early map. The squatters moved on, but the name remained. The Monaro Maffra was probably connected to Mafra, a town in Portugal.

The township was settled in the 1860s, the Post Office opening on 20 July 1864. Maffra railway station on the Maffra railway line opened in 1887. The last regular passenger service ran in 1977. The station precinct is now an industrial precinct and the former station building is used for community purposes.

Maffra was long the beef cattle capital of West Gippsland and, for many years, the only beet sugar processing center in the country. The Beet Museum, set in the Port of Maffra Park, has relics from the defunct sugar beet industry. The building is a relocated historic weighbridge building, and is lined with pine boards from the home of Charles and Grace Quirk, one of Maffra's first cottages.

Today
Maffra hosts a Mardi Gras every March, the Maffra and District Agricultural, Pastoral and Horticultural Show in October and a tennis tournament at Easter.

The Wellington Shire Council removed a row of 100+ year old trees that line the main street because of disease, but has since replaced them with young oaks.

Maffra has two primary schools, the Maffra Primary School and St Mary's Primary School (Catholic). Maffra also has a public secondary school, Maffra Secondary College, which has a student enrolment of around 700. Maffra Secondary has a strong academic program and is involved in a number of community service programs.

Plant toxicity for dogs

In July 2021, Victoria had over 50 pet dogs suffering liver toxicity, with 14 dogs known to have died from the condition. The source of the issue was traced to indospicine sourced from Indogofera plants. Many of the dogs had eaten raw pet food sourced from a knackery at Maffra. No specific source for the contamination was immediately identified, as these plants are not normally found in southern Australia. This toxicity has previously been seen in dogs fed meat from Australian feral camels, common in northern Australia.

Sport
The town has an Australian Rules football team competing in the Gippsland Football League. Its senior side was at one point the most successful in the league, winning 6 premierships in the early 2000s. 

Maffra is also home to a field hockey club, fielding junior, women's and men's teams in the East Gippsland Hockey Association playing at Cameron Sports Complex, Morison Street. Also at this complex, is Maffra's Amateur Basketball Association. This hosts junior and senior teams, as well as Men and Women's CBL teams.

Golfers play at the course of the Maffra Golf Club on Fulton Road.

Notable people
 Bill Bennett, AFL player, member of Carlton Football Club
 Sam Berry, AFL player with Adelaide Football Club
 John Butcher, AFL player with Port Adelaide Football Club
 John Hipwell, Australian architect 
 Shane Watts former world champion off-road motorcycle racer

References

External links

Towns in Victoria (Australia)
Shire of Wellington